Greatest Hits on Monument may refer to:

Greatest Hits on Monument (Connie Smith album), a 1993 album release by Connie Smith
Greatest Hits on Monument (Jeannie Seely album), a 1993 album release by Jeannie Seely